Kiefer Sherwood (born March 31, 1995) is an American professional ice hockey right winger for the  Nashville Predators of the National Hockey League (NHL).

Playing career
Sherwood was selected in the seventh-round, 99th overall, by the Youngstown Phantoms in the 2012 USHL Entry Draft.

While Sherwood and his brother went undrafted to the NHL, they were both invited to the Columbus Blue Jackets 2015 development camp. Leaving without a contract, Sherwood began his freshman season at Miami University.

On March 20, 2018, Sherwood signed a two-year, entry-level contract with the Anaheim Ducks as an undrafted free agent after playing three years of college hockey at Miami University. Sherwood made the Ducks' 2018 opening night roster out of training camp. He made his NHL debut on October 4, where he recorded his first career NHL point to help the Ducks beat the San Jose Sharks 5–2. He recorded his first career NHL goal in a 5–3 loss to the Dallas Stars on October 13.

As an impending restricted free agent following the conclusion of his entry-level deal, Sherwood was not tendered a qualifying offer by the Ducks and was released to free agency on October 9, 2020. He was soon signed on the opening day of free agency to a one-year, two-way contract with the Colorado Avalanche,  who then re-signed him to another one-year, two-way deal on July 22, 2021. 

As a free agent again preceding the  season, Sherwood was signed to a one-year, two-way contract with the Nashville Predators on July 14, 2022.

Personal life
Sherwood was born to parents Roger and Yuko in Columbus, Ohio. His younger brother Kole is also a forward in the Nashville Predators organization.

Career statistics

Awards and honors

References

External links
 

1995 births
Living people
American men's ice hockey right wingers
American people of Japanese descent
American sportspeople of Japanese descent
Anaheim Ducks players
Colorado Avalanche players
Colorado Eagles players
Ice hockey players from Ohio
Miami RedHawks men's ice hockey players
Milwaukee Admirals players
Nashville Predators players
San Diego Gulls (AHL) players
Sportspeople from Columbus, Ohio
Undrafted National Hockey League players
USA Hockey National Team Development Program players
Youngstown Phantoms players